Romsåsen, in Askim in Indre Østfold in Viken county, Norway, is a hill that has an old nickel mine and minerals. It is now protected by law.

External links
www.askimmuseum.no (in Swedish)

Askim
Hills of Norway
Landforms of Viken (county)